

The  is an annual single elimination professional wrestling tournament held in DDT Pro-Wrestling (DDT).

After the first two editions in 2004 and 2005, DDT produced four annual King of DDT events from 2006 to 2009 which featured no tournament. The tournament returned in 2009 as the KO-D Openweight Championship Contendership Tournament. In 2011, the tournament reverted to its original name.

Though DDT also runs the annual D-Oh Grand Prix tournament, the King of DDT is different in that it is single-elimination, whereas the D-Oh Grand Prix is a round-robin. Like the D-Oh Grand Prix however, the winner of the tournament receives a shot at the KO-D Openweight Championship; this stipulation was added in 2009. Until 2020, the KO-D Openweight Champion at the time of the tournament did not participate and, since 2018, neither do the Right to Challenge Anytime, Anywhere Contract holders. In 2022, champion Tetsuya Endo had to vacate the title two days before the start of the tournament after he suffered an injury. It was then announced that, instead of receiving a shot at the title, the winner of this edition would be crowned champion.

The number of participants in the King of DDT has varied over the years, from a lowest of 8 in 2005 to a highest of 32 in 2018. Poison Sawada Julie is the inaugural winner of the tournament; Kudo, Harashima, Tetsuya Endo and Konosuke Takeshita are the only two-time winners.

Tournaments

Results

2004
The 2004 King of DDT Tournament was held from May 29 to May 30.

2005
The 2005 King of DDT Tournament was held from May 22 to May 29 and featured only eight participants. On the first day of the tournament, Yusuke Inokuma defeated Jun Inomata and Yoshihiko in a qualifying match to earn a spot in the tournament.

2009
The 2009 KO-D Openweight Championship Contendership Tournament ran from June 7 to July 10. Kota Ibushi, the winner of the tournament, went on to defeat Harashima for the championship on August 23, beginning his first reign with the title.

2010
The 2010 KO-D Openweight Championship Contendership Tournament ran from May 23 to May 30. Harashima, the winner of the tournament, went on to defeat Daisuke Sekimoto for the championship on July 25, beginning his fourth reign with the title.

2011
In 2011, the tournament reverted to the "King of DDT Tournament" name and ran from May 21 to May 29.  Kudo, the winner of the tournament, became the first two-time winner and went on to defeat Shuji Ishikawa for the championship on July 24, beginning his first reign with the title.

2012
The 2012 King of DDT Tournament ran from June 30 to July 8. Kenny Omega became the first non-Japanese to win the King of DDT Tournament and went on to fail in his challenge against KO-D Openweight Champion Kota Ibushi on August 18.

2013
The 2013 King of DDT Tournament ran from June 28 to July 7. Harashima, the winner of the tournament became the second two-time winner and went on to defeat Shigehiro Irie for the championship on August 18, beginning his fifth reign with the title.

2014
The 2014 King of DDT Tournament ran from June 14 to June 29. Isami Kodaka, the winner of the tournament went on to fail in his three-way challenge against Kenny Omega and KO-D Openweight Champion Harashima on August 17.

2015
The 2015 King of DDT Tournament ran from June 6 to June 28, covering three shows. Yukio Sakaguchi, the winner of the tournament went on to defeat Kudo for the championship on August 23, beginning his first reign with the title.

2016
The 2016 King of DDT Tournament ran from June 5 to June 26. Shuji Ishikawa, the winner of the tournament went on to defeat Konosuke Takeshita for the championship on August 28, beginning his fourth reign.

2017
The 2017 King of DDT Tournament ran from June 4 to June 25. Kazuki Hirata competed under the ring name of "Hirata Collection A.T.", a parody of Milano Collection A.T. Tetsuya Endo, the winner of the tournament went on to fail in his challenge against KO-D Openweight Champion Konosuke Takeshita on August 20.

2018
The 2018 King of DDT Tournament ran from July 31 to August 28. Instead of the usual 16 participants, this edition featured 32 participants. On July 23, it was announced a lottery would shuffle the final eight into new matches. Three days later, it was announced that Daiki Shimomura would be pulled out of the tournament after injuring his left MCL; he was replaced by Saki Akai. Six days later, Konosuke Takeshita pulled out of the tournament after suffering a shoulder injury and was replaced by Kazuki Hirata. Daisuke Sasaki, the winner of the tournament went on to defeat Danshoku Dino for the championship on October 21.

† The final eight participants were randomly shuffled into new matches.

2019
The 2019 King of DDT Tournament ran from April 29 to May 19. This edition featured 14 participants and a battle royale between six of the seven first round losers was held on the second day with the winner getting a bye to the second round. Konosuke Takeshita, the winner of the tournament went on to defeat Tetsuya Endo for the championship on July 15, beginning his fourth reign with the title.

† On the May 6 event, Harashima defeated Kota Umeda, Mao, Kazuki Hirata, Yuki Ueno and Mike Bailey in a battle royale to earn a spot in the second round of the tournament.
‡ Harashima and Kazusada Higuchi agreed to switch opponents.

2020
The 2020 King of DDT Tournament ran from August 8 to 23. This edition featured 28 participants and a "Dramatic Chance" battle royale between the losers of the first round was held on the second day, granting the winner a bye into the quarterfinals. The semifinalists were shuffled into new matches. For the first time since the introduction of the championship match reward, the reigning KO-D Openweight Champion Tetsuya Endo was allowed to participate in the tournament. Endo became the third two-time winner and received a 1 million yen prize from Blackout, the tournament sponsor. He went on to name Daisuke Sasaki as his challenger and then defeated him to retain the title on November 3, at Ultimate Party 2020.

† Tetsuya Endo won the Dramatic Chance battle royale to re-enter the tournament.

2021

The 2021 King of DDT Tournament ran from June 10 to July 4 with 16 participants. Jun Akiyama and Yuji Hino took part in their first tournament. Konosuke Takeshita became a two-time winner and went on to defeat Jun Akiyama at Wrestle Peter Pan 2021 to win the KO-D Openweight Championship.

 † All semifinalists were randomly shuffled.

2022

The 2022 King of DDT Tournament ran from June 16 to July 3 with 16 participants. Hideki Okatani and Kanon made their first appearance in the tournament. Tetsuya Endo had to forfeit the tournament and vacate the KO-D Openweight Championship after having suffered a concussion at CyberFight Festival 2022. It was then announced that the winner of the tournament would be crowned champion. Kazusada Higuchi won the tournament for the first time and thus became the 79th KO-D Openweight Champion.

 † All semifinalists were randomly shuffled.

See also
DDT Pro-Wrestling
New Japan Cup
Ōdō Tournament
Wrestle-1 Grand Prix

Notes

References

DDT Pro-Wrestling
Professional wrestling tournaments